Jewel Records was a record label started in 1927 by the Plaza Music Company.With other Plaza properties, it became part of the American Record Corporation in 1929. It released records until 1932. Musicians on the label included Roy Collins, Hugh Donovan, Ernie Hare, Larry Holton, Billie Jones, the Dixie Jazz Band, and the Yankee Ten Orchestra.

References

See also 
 List of record labels

American record labels
Record labels established in 1927
Record labels disestablished in 1932
Jazz record labels